Vespula vidua, known generally as the long yellowjacket or widow yellowjacket, is a species of stinging wasp in the family Vespidae.

References

Further reading

External links

 

Vespidae
Insects described in 1854